Mark Hamway (born August 9, 1961, in Detroit, Michigan) is an American retired professional ice hockey player who played 53 games in the National Hockey League between 1985 and 1987 for the New York Islanders. The rest of his career, which lasted between 1983 and 1987, was spent in the minor leagues.

Career statistics

Regular season and playoffs

Awards and honors

References

External links

1961 births
Living people
American men's ice hockey forwards
Ice hockey people from Detroit
Indianapolis Checkers (CHL) players
Michigan State Spartans men's ice hockey players
New York Islanders draft picks
New York Islanders players
Springfield Indians players
Windsor Spitfires players